Murwillumbah is a town in far north-eastern New South Wales, Australia, in the Tweed Shire, on the Tweed River. Sitting on the south eastern foothills of the McPherson Range in the Tweed Volcano valley, Murwillumbah is 848 km north-east of Sydney, 13 km south of the Queensland border and 132 km south of Brisbane.

The town's name is often abbreviated to M'bah or Murbah. At the 2016 census, Murwillumbah had a population of 9,245. Many of the buildings are Art Deco in style and there are cafes, clothes shops and antique shops in the town.

History

The first people to live in the area were Kalibai people. The name Murwillumbah may derive from an Aboriginal compound meaning either "camping place" – from murrie, meaning "aboriginal people", wolli, "a camp", and bah, "place" – or alternatively from murra, "big", willum, "possum", and bah. Nearby Mount Warning and its attendant national park are known as Wollumbin, meaning "Cloud Catcher", in the Bundjalung language.

Timber-getters were drawn to the region in the 1840s. The river port at Tumbulgum was initially the main settlement. In 1902, a local government municipality was declared with Murwillumbah as its centre.

Most of the town's business district was destroyed by fire in 1907.

In 1918 an initial 18 allotments were advertised for sale in the Hartigan Estate and a subsequent 200 allotments were advertised for sale in September 1920. The land was bounded by the Tweed River and Commercial Road on the east, Condong Street on the north, Riverview Street on the west and Elizabeth Street to the south. The subdivision was sold as part of the estate of Denis Hartigan. In December 1923, "Bray Estate" made up of 9 farm and farmlet blocks was advertised to be auctioned by A. E. Budd & Son.

Murwillumbah was the location of Australia's largest-ever bank robbery, when A$1.7 million in cash was stolen from the vault of the Bank of New South Wales by the 'Magnetic drill gang' in 1978. The case remains unsolved.

Floods
Murwillumbah is protected by a series of levees, but they do not protect all parts of the town in major floods. The worst inundation, exceeding those of 1954, 1956, 1974, 2008 and 2009, started on 30 March 2017. There was extensive and severe flooding, with mass evacuations from South Murwillumbah and other low-lying areas, and road access cut from both north and south. It fell just short of overtopping the  levees protecting the central business district.

The March 1974 flood caused two hundred people to be evacuated from the town after floodwater from Tropical Cyclone Zoe inundated the area. In January 2008, Murwillumbah and its surrounding areas were hit by severe flooding, while May 2009 saw more evacuations in the town and surrounds after very heavy rainfall. Major flooding also occurred in 2022. The 2022 floods were the worst seen on record. Even worse than 2017, much of Murillumbah was inundated. The clean up is still ongoing.

Heritage listings 
Murwillumbah has a number of heritage-listed sites, including:
 Casino-Murwillumbah railway, South Murwillumbah: Murwillumbah railway station

Transport

The Pacific Highway passed through South Murwillumbah, but the town was completely bypassed when the 27 kilometre dual carriageway Yelgun to Chinderah upgrade was opened in August 2002. The pre-existing highway, now significantly quieter, was renamed The Tweed Valley Way, and is the main means of access to Murwillumbah from both north and south.

A road leading north west, a scenic tourist drive, heads along the Numinbah Valley through the towns of Chillingham, Numinbah and Natural Bridge. A road south west of the town heads to Kyogle via the town of Uki, passing near to Nimbin en route.

Murwillumbah railway station was the terminus of the Casino–Murwillumbah branch line, and had daily services to Sydney until the line closed in 2004. Today NSW TrainLink coaches to and from Casino provide connections to Sydney, while the station itself is used as a tourist information centre.

Several bus services serve the area. Murwillumbah Bus Company offers regular services to major parts of the town, as well as Condong and Uki. Parson's Bus Service links passengers with Pottsville, Cabarita Beach, and Stokers Siding. Gosel's Bus Service offers services to Nimbin via Uki. Singh's Bus Service links the town to Chillingham, Tyalgum and Eungella. Surfside Buslines operate hourly service to Tweed Heads via Terranora.

Murwillumbah's airfield, Whittle Field (ICAO code YMUR), is named after a noted local World War II Spitfire pilot, the late Bob Whittle. There are no scheduled flights, but its 800-metre grass runway supports Murwillumbah Aero Club and business activities including crop-dusting, aircraft restoration, training and scenic charter flights.

Industry
Aside from tourism, the major industry of the area, is sugarcane growing. The sugar mill at nearby Condong was served by numerous tramways until 1973 saw the introduction of mechanical cane harvesting. There is also some dairy farming in the area. Coffee, bananas and assorted tropical fruit and vegetables are also produced throughout the area. South Murwillumbah is home to Stone & Wood Brewing Co.'s second brewery, which opened in 2014. 

There are alternative lifestyle retreats nearby, including one of the Hare Krishna organisation.

Festivals
The annual Tweed Banana Festival, the second oldest festival in Australia is staged in the town. In 2005, the festival celebrated its 50th anniversary.

From 2002 to 2009 an historic motor racing festival was run through the streets of Murwillimbah, featuring a parade through town, a one kilometre hillclimb course, and connected events, attracting thousands of spectators. Modeled on the Goodwood Festival of Speed, Speed on Tweed was a highlight of the local calendar attracting cars and competitors from all over Australia and from Europe and North America. In September 2009 the event was held in conjunction with Rally Australia which has scheduled one special stage in Murwillumbah.

Demographics
The median age of the Murwillumbah population was 45 years, 7 years above the national median of 38.  81.1% of people living in Murwillumbah were born in Australia. The other top responses for country of birth were England 3.4%, New Zealand 1.9%, India 0.8%, Scotland 0.4%, and Philippines 0.4%. 89.2% of people spoke only English at home; the next most common languages were Punjabi 1.2%, Spanish 0.3%, Italian 0.3%, Tagalog 0.2%, and German 0.2%.

Climate
Murwillumbah has a humid subtropical climate. The Köppen climate classification is Cfa.

Education
Primary schools
Hare Krishna School
Mt St Patrick Primary School
Murwillumbah East Primary School
Sathya Sai School
South Murwillumbah's Infants School
St Joseph's Primary School
Murwillumbah Primary School
Tweed Valley Adventist College

Secondary schools
Hare Krishna School
 Mount Saint Patrick College
 Murwillumbah High School
Sathya Sai School
Wollumbin High School
Tweed Valley Adventist College

Sport and recreation 
Murwillumbah has numerous sports clubs including Murwillumbah Mustangs, Murwillumbah SC, The Gentlemen of Murwillumbah Rugby Club, golf, rowing, cricket, lawn bowls and cycling.

In popular culture 
Murwillumbah was used as the location for the film Lou (2010) starring John Hurt. The ABC television series of the novel Pastures of the Blue Crane was also filmed in the Tweed region in 1969. In 2018, the town was used as a film location for the Netflix-distributed Lunatics (2019) starring Chris Lilley. The town is close to the filming location of British reality TV show I'm A Celebrity...Get Me Out Of Here and is used as a base for staff and crew working on the show.

Notable people 
Notable people from Murwillumbah include:

 Doug Anthony (1929-2020), Australian politician
 Reginald Arnold (1924–2017), Australian cyclist
 Bob Batty (1939–2004), Australian rugby league player
 Mark Brokenshire (born 1961), Australian rugby league player
 Max Bryant (born 1999), Brisbane Heat & Queensland Cricketer
 Glenn Butcher (born 1961), Australian actor
 Larry Corowa (born 1957), Australian international rugby league player
 Bob Downe (born 1959), stage persona of the comedian Mark Trevorrow
 Nathan Eglington (born 1980), Australian field hockey midfielder and striker
 Stephanie Gilmore (born 1988), Australian surfer with eight world titles
 Robert Hagan (born 1947), Australian artist
 John Hargreaves (1945–1996), Australian actor
 Chris Higgins (1943–1990), senior Australian public servant
 Johno Johnson (born 1930), Australian politician
 Anthony Laffranchi (born 1980), Australian National Rugby League player
 Jenny McAllister (born 1973), Australian politician
 Tallulah Morton (born 1991), Australian model
 Walter Mussing (1916–1990), Australian rugby league player
 Barry Singh (born 1965), Australian musician
 Ann Symonds (1939–2018), Australian politician(s)
 Alan Woods (1945 - 2008), gambler, mathematician and actuary
 Dylan Wotherspoon (born 1993), Australian International Field Hockey player

Gallery

References

External links

Northern Rivers
Tweed Shire